Stefano Bosi (Florence, Italy 14 September 1954) is a former Italian table tennis player, and currently President of the European Table Tennis Union (ETTU). He is a candidate for presidency of the International Table Tennis Federation ITTF.

Education 
Bosi graduated at the ISEF (Superior Institute of Physical Education) in Florence, then graduated in Sports Science, at Tor Vergata University in Rome.

Career as table tennis player 
Bosi had 250 caps in the Italian Table Tennis National Team. 7-time winner of Italian men's senior title.

Knight Commander of the Italian Republic for sport activities and received the Italian Olympic Committee's “Stella d’Oro” in 1993. Bosi was President of Cefas, an institution taking care of  youngsters’ and leisure sport activities promotion in the Province of Terni, from 1996 to 2010. He was President of the Italian Table Tennis Association (Fitet), from 1990 to 2004, and president of European Table Tennis Union (ETTU) since 1996.

References

Italian male table tennis players
1954 births
Living people
Sportspeople from Florence
University of Rome Tor Vergata alumni